Bullying is the use of force, coercion, hurtful teasing or threat, to abuse, aggressively dominate or intimidate. The behavior is often repeated and habitual. One essential prerequisite is the perception (by the bully or by others) of an imbalance of physical or social power. This imbalance distinguishes bullying from conflict. Bullying is a subcategory of aggressive behavior characterized by hostile intent, imbalance of power and repetition over a period of time. Bullying is the activity of repeated, aggressive behavior intended to hurt another individual, physically, mentally or emotionally.

Bullying can be done individually or by a group, called mobbing, in which the bully may have one or more followers who are willing to assist the primary bully or who reinforce the bully by providing positive feedback such as laughing. Bullying in school and the workplace is also referred to as "peer abuse". Robert W. Fuller has analyzed bullying in the context of rankism. The Swedish-Norwegian researcher Dan Olweus says bullying occurs when a person is "exposed, repeatedly and over time, to negative actions on the part of one or more other persons", and that negative actions occur "when a person intentionally inflicts injury or discomfort upon another person, through physical contact, through words or in other ways". Individual bullying is usually characterized by a person behaving in a certain way to gain power over another person.

A bullying culture can develop in any context in which humans interact with each other. This may include school, family, the workplace, the home, and neighborhoods. The main platform for bullying in contemporary culture is on social media websites. In a 2012 study of male adolescent American football players, "the strongest predictor [of bullying] was the perception of whether the most influential male in a player's life would approve of the bullying behavior." A study by The Lancet Child & Adolescent Health in 2019 showed a relationship between social media use by girls and an increase in their exposure to bullying.

Bullying may be defined in many different ways. In the United Kingdom, there is no legal definition of bullying, while some states in the United States have laws against it. Bullying is divided into four basic types of abuse – psychological (sometimes called emotional or relational), verbal, physical, and cyber.

Behaviors used to assert such domination may include physical assault or coercion, verbal harassment, or threat, and such acts may be directed repeatedly toward particular targets. Rationalizations of such behavior sometimes include differences of social class, race, religion, gender, sexual orientation, appearance, behavior, body language, personality, reputation, lineage, strength, size, or ability.

Etymology 
The meaning deteriorated through the 17th century through "fine fellow", "blusterer", to "harasser of the weak". This may have been as a connecting sense between "lover" and "ruffian" as in "protector of a prostitute", which was one sense of "bully" (though not specifically attested until 1706). The verb "to bully" is first attested in 1710.

In the past, in American culture, the term has been used differently, as an exclamation/exhortation, in particular famously associated with Theodore Roosevelt and continuing to the present in the bully pulpit, Roosevelt's coining and also as faint/deprecating praise ("bully for him").

Types 
Bullying has been classified by the body of literature into different types. These can be in the form of nonverbal, verbal, or physical behavior. Another classification is based on perpetrators or the participants involved, so that the types include individual and collective bullying. Other interpretation also cite emotional and relational bullying in addition to physical harm inflicted towards another person or even property. There is also the case of the more recent phenomenon called cyberbullying.

Physical, verbal, and relational bullying are most prevalent in primary school and could also begin much earlier while continuing into later stages in individuals lives.

Individual 
Individual bullying tactics are perpetrated by a single person against a victim or victims. Individual bullying can be classified into four types outlined below:

Physical 
Physical bullying is any bullying that hurts someone's body or damages their possessions. Stealing, shoving, hitting, fighting, and intentionally destroying someone's property are types of physical bullying. Physical bullying is rarely the first form of bullying that a victim will experience. Often bullying will begin in a different form and later progress to physical violence. In physical bullying the main weapon the bully uses is his/her body, or some part thereof; or an object as a weapon when attacking his/her victim. Sometimes groups of young adults will target and alienate a peer because of some adolescent prejudice. This can quickly lead to a situation where they are being taunted, tortured, and "beaten up" by their classmates. Physical bullying will often escalate over time, and can lead to a detrimental or fatal ending, and therefore many try to stop it quickly to prevent any further escalation.

Verbal 
Verbal bullying is one of the most common types of bullying. This is any bullying that is conducted by speaking, other use of the voice, or some form of body language and does not involve any physical contact. Bullying usually begins at this stage and includes any of the following:

Derogatory name-calling and nicknaming
Spreading rumors or lying about someone
Threatening someone
Yelling at or talking to someone in a rude or unkind tone of voice, especially without justifiable cause
Mocking someone's voice or style of speaking
Laughing at someone
Use of body language (i.e., the middle finger) to torture someone
Making insults or otherwise making fun of someone

In verbal bullying, the main weapon the bully uses is voice. In many cases, verbal bullying is common in both genders, but girls are more likely to perform it. Girls, in general, are more subtle with insults than boys. Girls use verbal bullying, as well as social exclusion techniques, to dominate and control other individuals and show their superiority and power, often to try to impress someone they idolize. Many boys are subtle enough to use verbal techniques for domination when they want to avoid the trouble that can come with physically bullying someone else.

Relational 
Relational bullying (sometimes referred to as social aggression) is the type of bullying that uses relationships to hurt others. The term also denotes any bullying that is done with the intent to hurt somebody's reputation or social standing which can also link in with the techniques included in physical and verbal bullying. Relational bullying is a form of bullying common among youth, but particularly upon girls. Social exclusion (slighting or making someone feel "left out") is one of the most common types of relational bullying. Relational bullying can be used as a tool by bullies to both improve their social standing and control others. Unlike physical bullying which is obvious, relational bullying is not overt and can continue for a long time without being noticed.

Cyber 
Cyberbullying is the use of technology to harass, threaten, embarrass, or target another person. When an adult is involved, it may meet the definition of cyber-harassment or cyberstalking, a crime that can have legal consequences and involve jail time. This includes bullying by use of email, instant messaging, social media websites (such as Facebook), text messages, and cell phones. It is stated that Cyberbullying is more common in secondary school than in primary school.

The internet provides people with limited accountability and no filter. The use of technology for bullying can be detrimental to someones online reputation.  The information put out online will stay there forever, unless taken down by the person who put it out there and sometimes not even then. Future jobs and people will be able to see others' digital footprint and how you treated others. Another problem with cyberbullying is that other people can get involved. Technology, especially the use of social media, allows others to repost or share content whether it is positive or negative.

Collective 
Collective bullying tactics are employed by more than one individual against a victim or victims. Collective bullying is known as mobbing, and can include any of the individual types of bullying. Trolling behavior on social media, although generally assumed to be individual in nature by the casual reader, is sometime organized efforts by sponsored astroturfers.

Mobbing 

Mobbing refers to the bullying of an individual by a group, in any context, such as a family, peer group, school, workplace, neighborhood, community, or online. When it occurs as emotional abuse in the workplace, such as "ganging up" by co-workers, subordinates or superiors, to force someone out of the workplace through rumor, innuendo, intimidation, humiliation, discrediting, and isolation, it is also referred to as malicious, nonsexual, nonracial/racial, general harassment.

Characteristics

Bullies and accomplices 
Studies have shown that envy and resentment may be motives for bullying. Research on the self-esteem of bullies has produced equivocal results. While some bullies are arrogant and narcissistic, they can also use bullying as a tool to conceal shame or anxiety or to boost self-esteem: by demeaning others, the abuser feels empowered. Bullies may bully out of jealousy or because they themselves are bullied. Psychologist Roy Baumeister asserts that people who are prone to abusive behavior tend to have inflated but fragile egos. Because they think too highly of themselves, they are frequently offended by the criticisms and lack of deference of other people, and react to this disrespect with violence and insults.

Researchers have identified other risk factors such as depression and personality disorders, as well as quickness to anger and use of force, addiction to aggressive behaviors, mistaking others' actions as hostile, concern with preserving self-image, and engaging in obsessive or rigid actions. A combination of these factors may also be causes of this behavior. In one study of youth, a combination of antisocial traits and depression was found to be the best predictor of youth violence, whereas video game violence and television violence exposure were not predictive of these behaviors.

Bullying may also result from a genetic predisposition or a brain abnormality in the bully. While parents can help a toddler develop emotional regulation and control to restrict aggressive behavior, some children fail to develop these skills due to insecure attachment with their families, ineffective discipline, and environmental factors such as a stressful home life and hostile siblings. Moreover, according to some researchers, bullies may be inclined toward negativity and perform poorly academically. Dr. Cook says, "A typical bully has trouble resolving problems with others and also has trouble academically. He or she usually has negative attitudes and beliefs about others, feels negatively toward himself/herself, comes from a family environment characterized by conflict and poor parenting, perceives school as negative and is negatively influenced by peers."

Contrarily, some researchers have suggested that some bullies are psychologically strongest and have high social standing among their peers, while their targets are emotionally distressed and socially marginalized. Peer groups often promote the bully's actions, and members of these peer groups also engage in behaviors, such as mocking, excluding, punching, and insulting one another as a source of entertainment. Other researchers also argued that a minority of the bullies, those who are not in-turn bullied, enjoy going to school, and are least likely to take days off sick.

Research indicates that adults who bully have authoritarian personalities, combined with a strong need to control or dominate. It has also been suggested that a prejudicial view of subordinates can be a particularly strong risk factor.

In a recent study, bullies showed lower school performance-related self-esteem than non-involved students. They also showed higher social self-esteem than victims of traditional bullying.

Brain studies have shown that the section of the brain associated with reward becomes active when bullies are shown a video of someone inflicting pain on another.

Bystanders 
Often, bullying takes place in the presence of a large group of relatively uninvolved bystanders. In many cases, it is the bully's ability to create the illusion they have the support of the majority present that instills the fear of "speaking out" in protestation of the bullying activities being observed by the group. Unless the "bully mentality" is effectively challenged in any given group in its early stages, it often becomes an accepted, or supported, norm within the group.

Unless action is taken, a "culture of bullying" is often perpetuated within a group for months, years, or longer.

Bystanders who have been able to establish their own "friendship group" or "support group" have been found to be far more likely to opt to speak out against bullying behavior than those who have not.

In addition to communication of clear expectations that bystanders should intervene and increasing individual self-efficacy, there is growing research to suggest interventions should build on the foundation that bullying is morally wrong.

Among adults, being a bystander to workplace bullying was linked to depression.

The Bystander effect can be detrimental to the person being bullied. People are less likely to stand up for someone or something when others are around. In the case of cyberbullying, people that see bullying happen on social media are less likely to say something back, whether online or in person. People can have good intentions and want to help, but with no action nothing will be accomplished. "The act of others stepping in is what will stop bullying". To stop the Bystander effect, people should be confident and stand up for what they believe in. Do not worry what people think of you, rather think of what the benefits can be for the person being bullied.

Victims 
Dr. Cook says, "A typical victim is likely to be aggressive, lack social skills, think negative thoughts, experience difficulties in solving social problems, come from a negative family, school and community environments and be noticeably rejected and isolated by peers." Victims often have characteristics such as being physically and mentally weak, as well as being easily distraught emotionally. They may also have physical characteristics that make them easier targets for bullies such as being overweight or having some type of physical deformity. Boys are more likely to be victims of physical bullying while girls are more likely to be bullied indirectly.

Low levels of self-esteem has been identified as a frequent antecedent of bullying victimization. Victims of traditional bullying tend to have lower global, social, body-related, and emotional self-esteem compared to uninvolved students. 
Victims of cyberbullying, on the other hand, may not have lower self-esteem scores than uninvolved students but might have higher body-related self-esteem than both victims of traditional bullying and bullies.

It has also been shown that victims are more likely to employ self-defeating or self-deprecating humor intended to entertain others at the expense of themselves and their own feelings.

The results of a meta-analysis conducted by Cook and published by the American Psychological Association in 2010 concluded the main risk factors for children and adolescents being bullied, and also for becoming bullies, are the lack of social problem-solving skills.

Children who are bullied often show physical or emotional signs, such as: being afraid to attend school, complaining of headaches or a loss of appetite, a lack of interest in school activities, spending time with friends or family, reluctance to go out in public for fear they may encounter their bullies in public places other than school, and having an overall sense of sadness.

Effects 

Mona O'Moore of the Anti-Bullying Centre at Trinity College in Dublin, has written, "There is a growing body of research which indicates that individuals, whether child or adult, who are persistently subjected to abusive behavior are at risk of stress related illness which can sometimes lead to suicide"
Those who have been the targets of bullying can develop long-term emotional and behavioral problems. Bullying can cause loneliness, depression, anxiety, lead to low self-esteem and increased susceptibility to illness. Bullying has also been shown to cause maladjustment in young children, and targets of bullying who were also bullies themselves exhibit even greater social difficulties. A mental health report also found that bullying was linked to eating disorders, anxiety, body dysmorphia and other negative psychological effects. Both victims and perpetrators have been shown to exhibit higher levels of loneliness.

Suicide 

Even though there is evidence that bullying increases the risk of suicide, bullying alone does not cause suicide. Depression is one of the main reasons why kids who are bullied die by suicide. It is estimated that between 15 and 25 children die by suicide every year in the UK alone because they are being bullied. Certain groups seem to incur a higher risk for suicide, such as Native Americans, Alaskan Natives, Asian Americans, and LGBT people. When someone feels unsupported by family or friends, it can make the situation much worse for the victim.

In a self-report study completed in New York by 9th through 12th graders, victims of bullying reported more depressive symptoms and psychological distress than those who did not experience bullying. All types of involvement in bullying among both boys and girls is associated with depression even a couple years later. Another study that followed up with Finnish teens two years after the initial survey showed that depression and suicidal ideation is higher with teens who are bullied than those who did not report experiencing bullying. A Dutch longitudinal study on elementary students reported that boys who are bully-victims, who play both roles of a victim and a bully, were more likely to experience depression or serious suicidal ideation than the other roles, victims or bullies only, while girls who have any involvement in bullying have a higher level of risk for depression. In a study of high school students completed in Boston, students who self reported being victims of bullying were more likely to consider suicide when compared to youth who did not report being bullied. The same study also showed a higher risk of suicidal consideration in youth who report being a perpetrator, victim, or victim-perpetrator. Victims and victim-bullies are associated with a higher risk of suicide attempts. The place where youth live also appears to differentiate their bullying experiences such that those living in more urban areas who reported both being bullied and bullying others appear to show higher risk of suicidal ideation and suicide attempts. A national survey given to American 6th through 10th grade students found that cyberbullying victims experience a higher level of depression than victims experiencing other forms of bullying. This can be related to the anonymity behind social media. If a teen is being bullied and is displaying symptoms of depression it should be questioned and interventions should be implemented. The Danish study showed that kids who are bullied talked to their parents and teachers about it and some reported a decrease in bullying or a stop in the bullying after a teacher or parent intervened. The study emphasizes the importance of implementing program-collaborations in schools to have programs and anti-bullying interventions in place to prevent and properly intervene when it occurs. The study also shows the importance of having parents and teachers talk to the bullies about their bullying behavior in order to provide the necessary support for those experiencing bullying.

While some people find it very easy to ignore a bully, others may find it very difficult and reach a breaking point. There have been cases of apparent bullying suicides that have been reported closely by the media. These include the deaths of Ryan Halligan, Phoebe Prince, Dawn-Marie Wesley, Nicola Ann Raphael, Megan Meier, Audrie Pott, Tyler Clementi, Jamey Rodemeyer, Kenneth Weishuhn, Jadin Bell, Kelly Yeomans, Rehtaeh Parsons, Amanda Todd, Brodie Panlock, Jessica Haffer, Hamed Nastoh, Sladjana Vidovic, April Himes, Cherice Moralez and Rebecca Ann Sedwick. According to the suicide awareness voices for education, suicide is one of the leading causes of death for youth from 15 to 24 years old. Over 16 percent of students seriously consider suicide, 13 percent create a plan, and 8 percent have made a serious attempt.

Strength and wisdom 
Some have argued that bullying can teach life lessons and instill strength. Helene Guldberg, a child development academic, sparked controversy when she argued that being a target of bullying can teach a child "how to manage disputes and boost their ability to interact with others", and that teachers should not intervene but leave children to respond to the bullying themselves. Others, however, have pointed out that this is only true for normal peer conflicts but not for bullying cases.

The teaching of anti-bullying coping skills to children, carers and teachers has been found to be an effective long-term means of reducing bullying incidence rates and a valuable skill-set for individuals.

Testosterone production 
Statistically controlling for age and pubertal status, results indicated that on average verbally bullied girls produced less testosterone, and verbally bullied boys produced more testosterone than their nonbullied counterparts.

Dark triad 

Research on the dark triad (narcissism, Machiavellianism, and psychopathy) indicate a correlation with bullying as part of evidence of the aversive nature of those traits.

Projection 

A bully may project his/her own feelings of vulnerability onto the target(s) of the bullying activity. Despite the fact that a bully's typically denigrating activities are aimed at the bully's targets, the true source of such negativity is ultimately almost always found in the bully's own sense of personal insecurity and/or vulnerability. Such aggressive projections of displaced negative emotions can occur anywhere from the micro-level of interpersonal relationships, all the way up through to the macro-level of international politics, or even international armed conflict.

Emotional intelligence 

Bullying is abusive social interaction between peers which can include aggression, harassment, and violence. Bullying is typically repetitive and enacted by those who are in a position of power over the victim. A growing body of research illustrates a significant relationship between bullying and emotional intelligence (EI). Mayer et al., (2008) defines the dimensions of overall EI as "accurately perceiving emotion, using emotions to facilitate thought, understanding emotion, and managing emotion". The concept combines emotional and intellectual processes. Lower emotional intelligence appears to be related to involvement in bullying, as the bully and/or the victim of bullying. EI seems to play an important role in both bullying behavior and victimization in bullying; given that EI is illustrated to be malleable, EI education could greatly improve bullying prevention and intervention initiatives.

Context

Internet 

Cyberbullying is any bullying done through the use of technology. This form of bullying can easily go undetected because of lack of authoritative (including parental) supervision. Because bullies can pose as someone else, it is the most anonymous form of bullying. Cyberbullying includes abuse using email, instant messaging, text messaging, websites, and social networking sites. Particular watchdog organizations have been designed to contain the spread of cyberbullying.

Disability 

Disabled people are disproportionately affected by bullying and abuse, and such activity has been cited as a hate crime. The bullying is not limited to those who are visibly disabled, such as wheelchair users or physically deformed such as those with a cleft lip, but also those with developmental disabilities such as autism and developmental coordination disorder.

There is an additional problem that those with learning disabilities are often not as able to explain things to other people, so are more likely to be disbelieved or ignored if they do complain.

Homosexuality 

Gay bullying and gay bashing designate direct or indirect verbal or physical actions by a person or group against someone who is gay or lesbian, or perceived to be so due to rumors or because they are considered to fit gay stereotypes. Gay and lesbian youth are more likely than straight youth to report bullying, as well as be bullied.

Law 

Legal bullying is the bringing of a vexatious legal action to control and punish a person. Legal bullying can often take the form of frivolous, repetitive, or burdensome lawsuits brought to intimidate the defendant into submitting to the litigant's request, not because of the legal merit of the litigant's position, but principally due to the defendant's inability to maintain the legal battle. This can also take the form of Strategic Lawsuit Against Public Participation (SLAPP). It was partially concern about the potential for this kind of abuse that helped to fuel the protests against SOPA and PIPA in the United States in 2011 and 2012.

Military 

In 2000, the UK Ministry of Defence (MOD) defined bullying as "the use of physical strength or the abuse of authority to intimidate or victimize others, or to give unlawful punishments".

Some argue that this behaviour should be allowed, due to ways in which "soldiering" is different from other occupations. Soldiers expected to risk their lives should, according to them, develop strength of body and spirit to accept bullying.

Parenting 

Parents who may displace their anger, insecurity, or a persistent need to dominate and control upon their children in excessive ways have been proven to increase the likelihood that their own children will in turn become overly aggressive or controlling towards their peers.
The American Psychological Association advises on its website that parents who may suspect their own children may be engaging in bullying activities among their peers should carefully consider the examples which they themselves may be setting for their own children regarding how they typically interact with their own peers, colleagues, and children.

Prison 

The prison environment is known for bullying. An additional complication is the staff and their relationships with the inmates. Thus, the following possible bullying scenarios are possible:
 Inmate bullies inmate (echoing school bullying)
 Staff bullies inmate
 Staff bullies staff (a manifestation of workplace bullying)
 Inmate bullies staff

School 

It is important to distinguish school bullying that per definition has the goal of harming the victim from normal peer conflict that is an inherent part of everyday school life and often promotes social development. Unlike normal conflict, bullying is a systematic and repeated abuse committed intentionally by another student who has more power (physical, social, or otherwise).

Bullying can occur in nearly any part in or around the school building, although it may occur more frequently during physical education classes and activities such as recess. Bullying also takes place in school hallways, bathrooms, on school buses and while waiting for buses, and in classes that require group work and/or after school activities. Bullying in school sometimes consists of a group of students taking advantage of or isolating one student in particular and gaining the loyalty of bystanders who want to avoid becoming the next target. In the 2011 documentary Bully, we see first hand the torture that kids go through both in school and while on the school bus. As the movie follows around a few kids we see how bullying affects them both at school as well as in their homes. While bullying has no age limit, these bullies may taunt and tease their target before finally physically bullying them. Bystanders typically choose to either participate or watch, sometimes out of fear of becoming the next target.

Teachers play an important role in bullying prevention and intervention because they are the adults who spend most of their time with the students. 
Bullying can, however, also be perpetrated by teachers and the school system itself; there is an inherent power differential in the system that can easily predispose to subtle or covert abuse (relational aggression or passive aggression), humiliation, or exclusion—even while maintaining overt commitments to anti-bullying policies.

In 2016, in Canada, a North American legal precedent was set by a mother and her son, after the son was bullied in his public school. The mother and son won a court case against the Ottawa-Carleton District School Board, making this the first case in North America where a school board has been found negligent in a bullying case for failing to meet the standard of care (the "duty of care" that the school board owes to its students). Thus, it sets a precedent of a school board being found liable in negligence for harm caused to a child, because they failed to protect a child from the bullying actions of other students. There has been only one other similar bullying case and it was won in Australia in 2013 (Oyston v. St. Patricks College, 2013).

Heterosexuality 

Sexual bullying is "any bullying behaviour, whether physical or non-physical, that is based on a person's sexuality or gender. It is when sexuality or gender is used as a weapon by boys or girls towards other boys or girls – although it is more commonly directed at girls. It can be carried out to a person's face, behind their back or through the use of technology."

Transsexuality 

Trans bashing is the act of victimizing a person physically, sexually, or verbally because they are transgender or transsexual. Unlike gay bashing, it is committed because of the target's actual or perceived gender identity, not sexual orientation.

Work 

Workplace bullying occurs when an employee experiences a persistent pattern of mistreatment from others in the workplace that causes harm. Workplace bullying can include such tactics as verbal, nonverbal, psychological, physical abuse and humiliation. This type of workplace aggression is particularly difficult because, unlike the typical forms of school bullying, workplace bullies often operate within the established rules and policies of their organization and their society. Bullying in the workplace is in the majority of cases reported as having been perpetrated by someone in authority over the target. Bullies can also be peers, and occasionally can be subordinates.

The first known documented use of "workplace bullying" is in 1992 in a book by Andrea Adams called Bullying at Work: How to Confront and Overcome It.

Research has also investigated the impact of the larger organizational context on bullying as well as the group-level processes that impact on the incidence, and maintenance of bullying behavior. Bullying can be covert or overt. It may be missed by superiors or known by many throughout the organization. Negative effects are not limited to the targeted individuals, and may lead to a decline in employee morale and a change in organizational culture. A Cochrane Collaboration systematic review has found very low quality evidence to suggest that organizational and individual interventions may prevent bullying behaviors in the workplace.

Academia 

Bullying in academia is workplace bullying of scholars and staff in academia, especially places of higher education such as colleges and universities. It is believed to be common, although has not received as much attention from researchers as bullying in some other contexts.

Blue-collar jobs 
Bullying has been identified as prominent in blue-collar jobs, including on oil rigs and in mechanic shops and machine shops. It is thought that intimidation and fear of retribution cause decreased incident reports. In industry sectors dominated by males, typically of little education, where disclosure of incidents are seen as effeminate, reporting in the socioeconomic and cultural milieu of such industries would likely lead to a vicious circle. This is often used in combination with manipulation and coercion of facts to gain favour among higher-ranking administrators.

Information technology 

A culture of bullying is common in information technology (IT), leading to high sickness rates, low morale, poor productivity, and high staff-turnover. Deadline-driven project work and stressed-out managers take their toll on IT workers.

Courts 

Bullying in the legal profession is believed to be more common than in some other professions. It is believed that its adversarial, hierarchical tradition contributes towards this. Women, trainees and solicitors who have been qualified for five years or less are more affected, as are ethnic minority lawyers and lesbian, gay and bisexual lawyers.

Medicine 

Bullying in the medical profession is common, particularly of student or trainee doctors and of nurses. It is thought that this is at least in part an outcome of conservative traditional hierarchical structures and teaching methods in the medical profession, which may result in a bullying cycle.

Even though The American Nurses Association believes that all nursing personnel have the right to work in safe, non-abusive environments, bullying has been identified as being particularly prevalent in the nursing profession although the reasons are not clear. It is thought that relational aggression (psychological aspects of bullying such as gossiping and intimidation) are relevant. Relational aggression has been studied among girls but not so much among adult women.

Teaching 

School teachers are commonly the subject of bullying but they are also sometimes the originators of bullying within a school environment.

Machines 
Children have been observed bullying anthropomorphic robots designed to assist the elderly. Their attacks start with blocking the robots' paths of movement and then escalate to verbal abuse, hitting and destroying the object. Seventy-five percent of the kids interviewed perceived the robot as "human-like" yet decided to abuse it anyway, while 35% of the kids who beat up the robot did so "for enjoyment".

Prevention 

Bullying prevention is the collective effort to prevent, reduce and stop bullying. Many campaigns and events are designated to bullying prevention throughout the world. Bullying prevention campaigns and events include Anti-Bullying Day, Anti-Bullying Week, International Day of Pink, International STAND UP to Bullying Day and National Bullying Prevention Month. Anti-bullying laws in the U.S. have also been enacted in 23 of its 50 states, making bullying in schools illegal.

Bullying prevention programs allow schools to help decrease cyberbullying within he realm of school. The prevention methods are targeted mainly for middle schoolers, where we see the most bullying occur. To help decrease cyberbullying, people need to take preventative measures. One preventative method was implemented to determine the effectiveness against cyberbullying. This program called "Media Heroes" showed how educating teachers on bullying behaviors in school can help them educate and stop students from bullying. This educational program decreased bullying in their schools. Having trusted adults become educated on what can go on online, can help prevent further cyberbullying.

Responses 
Bullying is typically ongoing and not isolated behaviour. Common responses are to try to ignore it, to confront the bullies, or to turn to an authority figure.

Ignoring it often does nothing to stop the bullying continuing, and it can become worse over time.
It can be important to address bullying behaviour early on, as it can be easier to control the earlier it is detected.
Bystanders play an important role in responding to bullying, as doing nothing can encourage it to continue, while small steps that oppose the behaviour can reduce it.

Authority figures can play an important role, such as parents or teachers in child or adolescent situations, or supervisors, human-resources staff or parent-bodies in workplace and volunteer settings. In the school context, teachers who set clear boundaries, communicate seriously that bullying behavior is unacceptable and will not be tolerated, and involve school administrators have been shown to reduce bullying. Discussing bullying and its consequences with the whole class is also an important intervention that not only reduces bullying, but also encourages other students to step in and stop bullying even before it reaches its full form. In general, authority figures can be influential in recognising and stopping bullying behaviour, and creating an environment that does not encourage or promote bullying.

In many situations, authority figures are untrained and unqualified, do not know how to respond, and can make the situation worse.
In some cases the authority figures even support the people doing the bullying, facilitating it continuing and increasing the isolation and marginalising of the target.
Some of the most effective ways to respond are to recognise that harmful behaviour is taking place, and to create an environment where it will not continue.

See also

References

Further reading 
 Kohut MR The Complete Guide to Understanding, Controlling, and Stopping Bullies & Bullying: A Complete Guide for Teachers & Parents (2007)
 Bullies and Victims in Schools: a guide to understanding and management by Valerie E. Besag (1989)
 The Fight That Never Ends by Tim Brown
 Odd Girl Out: The Hidden Culture of Aggression in Girls by Rachel Simmons 
 Bullycide, Death at Playtime by Neil Marr and Tim Field 
 Bullycide in America: Moms Speak Out about the Bullying/Suicide Connection – by Brenda High, Bullycide.org
 A Journey Out of Bullying: From Despair to Hope by Patricia L. Scott
 "Peer Abuse Know More! Bullying From A Psychological Perspective" By Elizabeth Bennett
 New Perspectives on Bullying by Ken Rigby
 Garbarino, J. & de Lara, E. (2003). And Words Can Hurt Forever: How to Protect Adolescents from Bullying, Harassment, and Emotional Violence.  The Free Press: New York NY.
 Joanne Scaglione, Arrica Rose Scaglione Bully-proofing children: a practical, hands-on guide to stop bullying 2006
 Why Is Everybody Always Picking on Me: A Guide to Handling Bullies for Young People. by Terrence Webster-Doyle. Book and Teaching curriculum.
 "Why Nerds are Unpopular", by Paul Graham. This essay is an example of how even medium differences, in a hierarchical, zero-sum, or negative environments, can lead to ostracism or persecution.
 Lord of the Flies by William Golding (1954). A famous work describing how a group of schoolboys trapped on an island descends into savagery.

External links 

 Citizens Advice in the UK
 Bullying. No Way! (Australian Education Authorities)
 Bullying in schools (UK – schools)
 PBSKids.org "Great Books About Bullies"
 Be Brave Against Bullying, a UFT project 
 U.S. Department of Education's Education Resources Information Center (ERIC)
 Bully Online

 
Abuse
Aggression
Injustice
Persecution
Psychological abuse
Interpersonal conflict